This is a list of German television related events from 1988.

Events
31 March - Maxi & Chris Garden are selected to represent Germany at the 1988 Eurovision Song Contest with their song "Lied für einen Freund". They are selected to be the thirty-third German Eurovision entry during Ein Lied für Dublin held at the Frankenhalle in Nuremberg.

Debuts

Domestic
27 March -  (1988) (ARD)
3 October - Oh Gott, Herr Pfarrer (1988–1989) (ARD)
31 October - Die Bertinis (1988) (ZDF)
18 December -  (1988) (ARD)

International
3 January - // Inspector Gadget (1983–1986) (RTLplus)
9 January -  Knots Landing (1979–1993) (ZDF)
12 March -  Dempsey and Makepeace (1985–1986) (Bayern 3)
27 March -  The Kids of Degrassi Street (1979–1986) (ZDF)
20 June -  Disney's Adventures of the Gummi Bears (1985–1991) (Das Erste)

BFBS
5 February -  Aliens in the Family (1987)
25 July -  Kellyvision (1988)
7 October -  Small World (1988)
8 October -  Defenders of the Earth (1986–1987)
15 October -  Strange Interlude (1988)
18 October - / Jim Henson's Mother Goose Stories (1988)
19 October -  The Return of Shelley (1988–1992)
21 October -  A Piece of Cake (1988)
21 November -  The River (1988)
28 December -  The Watch House (1988)
 Count Duckula (1988–1993)
 Chatterbox (1988)
 Tube Mice (1988)
 Steel Riders (1987)
 The Snow Spider (1988)

Television shows

1950s
Tagesschau (1952–present)

1960s
 heute (1963–present)

1970s
 heute-journal (1978–present)
 Tagesthemen (1978–present)

1980s
Wetten, dass..? (1981–2014)
Lindenstraße (1985–present)

Births
February 29 - Lena Gercke, German fashion model and television host